Lloyd Zvasiya (born 28 May 1981) is a retired Zimbabwean sprinter who specialised in the 400 metres. He competed at the 2004 Summer Olympics without reaching the semifinals.

His personal best in the event is 45.51 from 2003.

Competition record

External links
 

1981 births
Living people
Zimbabwean male sprinters
Olympic athletes of Zimbabwe
Athletes (track and field) at the 2004 Summer Olympics
Athletes (track and field) at the 2003 All-Africa Games
African Games competitors for Zimbabwe